Auguszta Mátyás (born January 17, 1968, in Nagykanizsa) is a retired Hungarian handball player and Olympic medalist.

Clubs 

 – 1991 Nagykanizsai Olajbányász
 1991 – 1998 Dunaferr SE
 1998 – 1999 Cornexi Alcoa
 1999 – 2005 Váci NKSE
 2005             Ciudad Almeria
 2005 – 2006 Váci NKSE
 2006 – 2007 Kőbánya Spartacus

Awards
 Nemzeti Bajnokság I Top Scorer: 1991, 1992, 2002, 2004, 2005

References

External links
 Career statistics on Worldhandball.com

Hungarian female handball players
Olympic handball players of Hungary
Handball players at the 1996 Summer Olympics
Olympic bronze medalists for Hungary
People from Nagykanizsa
1968 births
Living people
Olympic medalists in handball
Medalists at the 1996 Summer Olympics
Sportspeople from Zala County